Vincent Favretto (born 5 April 1984) is a French pole vaulter.

As a junior, he won the silver medal at the 2001 World Youth Championships, the bronze medal at the 2002 World Junior Championships and the gold medal at the 2003 European Junior Championships. He finished fifth at the 2005 European U23 Championships.

He also competed at the 2005 European Indoor Championships, and the 2006 European Championships without reaching the final. He then returned to win the 2009 Jeux de la Francophonie.

His personal best is 5.65 metres, achieved in July 2006 in Bron.

References

1984 births
Living people
French male pole vaulters
20th-century French people
21st-century French people